Länsikylä is a village in the municipality of Pyhtää, Kymenlaakso, Southern Finland province, Finland.

Munasuo national park is located in Länsikylä region. Munasuo has been renowned as a place for birdwatchers to gather, as it houses a variety of rare birds.

Pyhtää
Villages in Finland